The Records or History of the Three Kingdoms, also known by its Chinese name as the Sanguo Zhi, is a Chinese historical text which covers the history of the late Eastern Han dynasty (c. 184–220 AD) and the Three Kingdoms period (220–280 AD). It is widely regarded as the official and authoritative source historical text for that period. Written by Chen Shou in the third century, the work synthesizes the histories of the rival states of Cao Wei, Shu Han and Eastern Wu in the Three Kingdoms period into a single compiled text.

The Records of the Three Kingdoms is the main source of influence for the 14th century historical novel Romance of the Three Kingdoms, considered one of the great four novels of Chinese classical literature.

Major chunks of the records have been translated into English, but the tome has yet to be fully translated.

Origin and structure
The Records of the Grand Historian, Book of Han and Book of the Later Han, and the Records of the Three Kingdoms make up the four early historical texts of the Twenty-Four Histories canon. The Records of the Three Kingdoms, also known as Sanguozhi, contains 65 volumes and about 360,000 Chinese characters broken into three books. The Book of Wei contains 30 volumes, the Book of Shu 15 volumes, while the Book of Wu contains 20 volumes. Each volume is organised in the form of one or more biographies.

The author Chen Shou, was born in present-day Nanchong, Sichuan, in the state of Shu Han. After the Conquest of Shu by Wei in 263, he became an official historian under the government of the Jin dynasty, and created a history of the Three Kingdoms period. After the Conquest of Wu by Jin in 280, his work received the acclaim of senior minister Zhang Hua.

Prior to the Jin dynasty, both the states of Cao Wei and Wu has already composed their own official histories, such as the Book of Wei by Wang Chen, the Weilüe by Yu Huan, and the Book of Wu by Wei Zhao. Chen Shou used these texts as the foundation of the Records of the Three Kingdoms. However, since the state of Shu lacked documents about its history, the Book of Shu in the Records was composed by Chen Shou himself based on his personal memories of his early life in Shu and other primary sources he collected, such as the writings of Zhuge Liang.

The Records of the Three Kingdoms used the year 220 AD—which marks the end of the Han dynasty—as the year in which the state of Wei was established. The Records refer to the rulers of Wei as 'Emperors' and those of Shu and Wu as 'Lords' or by their personal names.

Legacy
The Records of the Three Kingdoms was the main source of inspiration for the 14th century Romance of the Three Kingdoms, one of the four great Classic Chinese Novels. As such the records is considered one of the most influential historical and cultural texts in Chinese history. In addition, the records provide one of the earliest accounts of Korea and Japan. Chen's Records set the standard for how Korea and Japan would write their official histories as well.

Influence on Asia 
Chen's Records is the final text of the "Four Histories", which together influenced and served as a model for Korean and Japanese official histories.

The Records are important to the research of early Korean ( Samguk ji) and Japanese history (三国志 Sangokushi). It provides, among other things, the first detailed account of Korean and Japanese societies such as Goguryeo, Yemaek and Wa. The passages in Volume 30 about the Wa, where the Yamatai-koku and its ruler Queen Himiko are recorded, are referred to as the Wajinden in Japanese studies. The Japanese started writing their own records in the early 7th century and the earliest extant native record is the Kojiki of 712.

Romance of the Three Kingdoms 
The text forms the foundation on which the 14th-century novel Romance of the Three Kingdoms is based. In addition, Chen Shou's literary style and vivid portrayal of characters have been a source of influence for the novel.

The Records include biographies of historical figures such as Cao Cao and Guan Yu who feature prominently in the Romance of the Three Kingdoms. Some characters in the Romance were also fictional. See List of fictional people of the Three Kingdoms and List of fictitious stories in Romance of the Three Kingdoms. However, most of the historical facts were drawn from Chen's Records.

Dates
Due to the biographical rather than primarily annalistic arrangement of the work, assigning dates to the historical content is both imprecise and non-trivial. Certain volumes contain background information about their subjects' forebears which date back centuries before the main record. For example, the biography of Liu Yan begins with discussing his ancestor Liu Yu's enfeoffment at Jingling (present-day Tianmen, Hubei) in around 85 AD. The first event to receive detailed description throughout the work is the Yellow Turban Rebellion in 184. Many biographies make passing mention of the event, but more concrete information such as correspondence and troop movements during the uprising can be found in fragmentary form in at least four volumes: the biographies of Cheng Yu, Yu Jin, Liu Bei, and Sun Jian.

The three books in the Records of the Three Kingdoms end at different dates, with the main section of the Book of Wei ending with the abdication of Cao Huan in 265, the Book of Shu ending with the death of Liu Shan in 271, and the Book of Wu ending with the death of Sun Hao in 284.

One abstract regarding the chronology is translated as follows:

Contents

Book of Wei

Book of Shu

Book of Wu

Annotations

During the fifth century, the Liu Song dynasty historian Pei Songzhi (372–451) extensively annotated Chen Shou's Records of the Three Kingdoms using a variety of other sources, augmenting the text to twice the length of the original. This work, completed in 429, became one of the official histories of the Three Kingdoms period, under the title Sanguozhi zhu (三国志注 zhu meaning "notes").

Pei collected other records to add information he felt should be added. He provided detailed explanations to some of the geography and other elements mentioned in the original. He also included multiple accounts of the same events. Sometimes, the accounts he added contradicted each other, but he included them anyway since he could not decide which version was the correct one. If Pei added something that sounded wrong, he would make a note or even offer a correction. In regard to historical events and figures, as well as Chen Shou's original text, he added his own commentary. Crucially, he cited his sources in almost every case.

Translations
The Records of the Three Kingdoms has not been fully translated into English. William Gordon Crowell alludes to a project to translate Chen Shou's work with Pei Songzhi's commentary in full, but it was apparently discontinued. Parts of that project are published by Robert Joe Cutter and William Gordon Crowell under the title Empresses and Consorts: Selections from Chen Shou's Records of the Three States With Pei Songzhi's Commentary (University of Hawaii Press, 1999), which includes the translations for volumes 5, 34, and 50.

Other translations include Kenneth J. Dewoskin's Doctors Diviners and Magicians of Ancient China: Biographies of Fang-Shih (Columbia University Press, 1983), which includes a full translation of volume 29. Rafe de Crespigny, in addition to his translation of Sun Jian's biography (Volume 46), also translated excerpts of the Records of the Three Kingdoms in his translation of the Zizhi Tongjian that deals with the last years of the Han dynasty, as does Achilles Fang, who translated the Zizhi Tongjian volumes that deal with the Three Kingdoms period proper. The Zizhi Tongjian volumes in question draw heavily from Records of the Three Kingdoms. Further excerpts of the Records can be found in various sourcebooks dealing with East Asian history.

Below is a table containing the known English translations of the Records of the Three Kingdoms that have been published in academia:

See also
 Twenty-Four Histories
 Romance of the Three Kingdoms
 Lists of people of the Three Kingdoms
 Timeline of the Three Kingdoms period
 Military history of the Three Kingdoms
Chen Shou, the author of the Records of the Three Kingdoms
Luo Guanzhong, the attributed author of the Romance of the Three Kingdoms and who was influenced by Chen's writing

References

Citations

Sources

External links

  Records of the Three Kingdoms on the Chinese Text Project page
  Records of the Three Kingdoms 《三國志》 Chinese text with matching English vocabulary

Twenty-Four Histories
3rd-century history books
History books about the Three Kingdoms
Jin dynasty (266–420) literature